Brady may refer to:

People
 Brady (surname)
 Brady (given name)
 Brady (nickname)
 Brady Boone, a ring name of American professional wrestler Dean Peters (1958–1998)

Places in the United States 
 Brady, Montana, a census-designated place and unincorporated community
 Brady, Nebraska, a village
 Brady, Texas, a city
 Brady, Washington, a census-designated place
 Brady Township (disambiguation)
 Brady Lake (Ohio)
 Brady Creek Reservoir, also known as Brady Lake and Brady Reservoir, McCulloch County, Texas

Arts and entertainment 
 "Duncan and Brady", also known as "Brady", a traditional murder ballad
 The fictional Brady family, in the American television show The Brady Bunch and various sequels and spinoffs
 Brady Black, a character in the American soap opera Days of Our Lives

Companies 
 Brady Corporation, a manufacturer of products for identifying components used in workplaces
 Brady Drum Company, a manufacturer of drums in Western Australia

See also 
 Brady v. Maryland, a landmark 1963 US Supreme Court case
 Brady v. United States, a 1970 US Supreme Court case
 Brady v Brady, a 1989 UK company law case
 Brady Bonds, dollar-denominated bonds issued mostly by Latin American countries in the late 1980s
 Brady material, American legal principle regarding exculpatory or impeaching information that is material to the guilt or punishment of the defendant
 Brädi (born 1979), Finnish hip hop artist
 Bradie (disambiguation), a given name and surname
 Braidy Industries, an American aluminum alloy manufacturer